Mumianwan station is a station of Line 3, Shenzhen Metro. It was opened on 28 December 2010.

Station layout

Exits

References

External links
 Shenzhen Metro Mumianmwan Station (Chinese)
 Shenzhen Metro Mumianmwan Station (English)

Shenzhen Metro stations
Railway stations in Guangdong
Longgang District, Shenzhen
Railway stations in China opened in 2010